

The Baumgärtl PB-63 was a 1950s single-seat helicopter designed and built by the Austrian-designer Paul Baumgärtl for the Brazilian Air Ministry. The PB-63 was of a conventional pod and boom design with an open steel-tube construction and it had a single main rotor and a tail-mounted anti-torque rotor.  It had a tricycle landing gear with the pilot in an open sided cabin at the front. The PB-63 was powered by an  Continental C85-12 flat-four piston engine.

Specifications

See also

References

Notes

Bibliography

 Apostolo, Giorgio. The Illustrated Encyclopedia of Helicopters. New York: Bonanza Books, 1984. . 
 The Illustrated Encyclopedia of Aircraft Part Work 1982-1985). London: Orbis Publishing, 1985.
 Pereira, Roberto. Construção Aeronáutica no Brasil 1910–1976. São Paulo: Aquarius Editora, 1986. . 

1950s Brazilian civil utility aircraft
1950s Brazilian helicopters
PB-63
Single-engined piston helicopters